Chuchkovo is the name of several inhabited localities in Russia.

Urban localities
Chuchkovo, Ryazan Oblast, a work settlement in Chuchkovsky District of Ryazan Oblast

Rural localities
Chuchkovo, Vologda Oblast, a village in Chuchkovsky Selsoviet of Sokolsky District of Vologda Oblast